Dayiceras is a finely ribbed polymorphitid eoderoceratacean ammonoid cephalopod from the Jurassic, named by Spath in 1920.  The shell is evolute, coiled such that all whorls are exposed. The whorl section is compressed such as to be higher than wide. A row of fine tubercles runs along the middle of the outer rim, the venter.

Distribution
Jurassic deposites of British Columbia and the United Kingdom.

References
Notes

Bibliography
 Arell et al.,1957. Mesozoic Ammonoidea, Treatise on Invertebrate Paleontology Part L. Geological Society of America.

Eoderoceratoidea
Ammonitida genera
Jurassic ammonites
Extinct animals of Canada
Pliensbachian life